The 2004 SEC men's basketball tournament took place on March 11–14, 2004 in Atlanta, Georgia at the Georgia Dome. 

Kentucky won the tournament and received the SEC's automatic bid to the NCAA tournament by beating Florida on March 14, 2004.

Bracket

*overtime

References

SEC men's basketball tournament
2003–04 Southeastern Conference men's basketball season
SEC men's basketball tournament
SEC men's basketball tournament
SEC men's basketball tournament
College sports in Georgia (U.S. state)
Basketball in Georgia (U.S. state)